Wege zum Glück (English: Ways to Happiness) is a German telenovela. The show was starting on October 6, 2005 on ZDF and originally was planned to have 250 chapters. Later the concept was changed and the title became a label to tell different love stories in telenovela-style. After 789 chapters, the network decided to cancel the show. The last episode aired on February 24, 2009.

ZDF decided to end the show after ratings declined from season to season. Unable to find a successful replacement, the network announced in January 2012 that a deal was made with the production company Grundy UFA to reactivate the Wege zum Glück series. The melodramatic stories were also shown in Austria, Switzerland and Italy.

Overview

Season 1
Chapter 1 - Chapter 250: (Julia – Wege zum Glück) Julia Schilling meets Daniel Gravenberg on a tour in South Africa and they eventually start to fall for each other. But then Julia has to flee together with her troubled mother Christa. They get back to Germany and Julia thinks that she lost Daniel forever. Penniless, Julia tries to start a new life in the fictional town Falkental and begins working at a porcelain manufactory. She first doesn't know that Daniel is the junior executive at the company. After many complications and schemes from Daniel's mother Annabelle, the pair get their happy end.

Season 2
Chapter 251 - Chapter 500: Nina Bergmann is a single parent after her husband Max van Weyden went missing on a Photo Safari. Nina tried to find him, but in the end had to flee to her aunt Birgit Hertel, who lives in Falkental. She meets Julia's half brother Ben Petersen and falls in love with him after they work closely together in the manufactory. Eventually Nina has to fight for custody over her daughter as Annabelle's new husband Richard van Weyden, Max' father, doesn't think she's a responsible parent. As Annabelle has to fight against the rejection of Richard's daughter Viktoria, Nina finds a rival Elsa Ritter for Ben's heart just as Max returns into their lives. In the end, Nina and Ben get married and leave for their honeymoon in the Caribbeans.

Season 3
Chapter 501 - Chapter 703: Luisa Maywald comes together with her adoptive sister Nora to Falkental to search for her biological mother. Someday she runs into Simon Becker and realizes that he possesses her old talisman. Luisa gets into his atelier to get it back and is caught by Simon. As Luisa tries to get away she destroys a stature, who hits Simon's head. As Luisa runs off to get help, Nora gets to Simon and eventually turns up as a romantic rival for Simon's heart. After Nora finds out that Annabelle is her biological mother, she becomes part of her schemes and is used by Annabelle. In the end, Nora faces prison for a crime her mother committed and Luisa ends up marrying Simon. They leave Falkental behind and start a new life with their son Moritz in New Zealand.

Season 4
Chapter 704 - Chapter 789: Before the new season starts, chapters 704 to 710 focus on other storylines of the residents in Falkental. After that the audience sees Nora and how she tries to escape from a prison hospital. She flees to Hamburg and meets Alexander Wagner. The two spend an unforgettable day together, before Nora has to take a six-year sentence in prison. After six years, Nora and Alexander meet again on her birthday and she tells him her life story. They eventually discover that they are siblings and that their love is impossible. Caught between love and taboo, Nora and Alexander are unable to resist each other. After it is proven that they aren't brother and sister after all, the two get married while Annabelle is finally paying for her crimes. As she escapes from police custody, Annabelle decides to take her own life.

Cast

References 

German telenovelas
2005 German television series debuts
2009 German television series endings
German-language television shows
ZDF telenovelas